Edílson da Silva Ferreira (born 17 September 1971) is a Brazilian football pundit and retired footballer who played as a forward.

Dubbed as Capetinha, Edílson was a second striker who was known for his dribbling skills, and is mainly known for his stand-out performances with Brazilian clubs Palmeiras and Corinthians. In 1998, he received the Bola de Ouro, the award given to the best player of the Campeonato Brasileiro Série A.

At international level, he received 21 caps with the Brazil national team, scoring 6 goals, and taking part in the nation's 2002 FIFA World Cup victory.

Club career
Born in Salvador, Edílson youth development was spent in several amateur clubs of his home town. In 1990, he received an invitation of manager Jaime Braga to join Industrial Esporte Clube, which played in the Campeonato Capixaba, where he became a professional footballer. A year later, he moved to Tanabi in the Paulista A2, with his performances attracting attention of larger clubs in the São Paulo region, first Guarani in 1992, and latter Palmeiras in 1993, momentarily breaking the Série A transfer record, being surpass two weeks later by Edmundo.

At Palmeiras, Edilson played alongside Edmundo, Zinho, Roberto Carlos, Mazinho, César Sampaio, in a team that won two consecutive league titles, in 1993 and 1994, plus two Campeonato Paulista and the Torneio Rio – São Paulo. During this time, he received his first callup to the national team. In 1994, Edilson moved abroad for the first team, joining Benfica in the Primeira Liga on a loan deal. He made his debut on 21 August, replacing Abel Xavier, in a 2–0 home win against S.C. Beira-Mar. Although Artur Jorge only made him a regular starter from December onwards, Edilson still finished the 1994–95 season as the club top scorer, with 17 goals. He returned to Palmeiras for the remainder of 1995, only to move to Kashiwa Reysol in the J1 League in 1996, in a second loan deal. In the two seasons in Japan, Edílson finished both as runner-up in Golden Boot ranking, scoring 21 goals in 1996, and 23 in 1997.

Back to Brazil, Edílson joined Palmeiras old rival, Corinthians in 1997. He remained a goalscorer, and partnered with Marcelinho Carioca, and latter Luizão; he helped the team win the league title in 1998 and 1999, adding accolades for Bola de Ouro in the first of those years. A notable event of his period at Corinthians was the 1999 Campeonato Paulista Final against Palmeiras, with the title already in Corinthians hands, Edilson started taunting his opponents by playing with the ball, which led to a brawl that ended the match. A repercussion of this, was the annulment of his call up for the 1999 Copa América, which was given to Ronaldinho instead. In the inaugural FIFA Club World Cup, in 2000, Edílson was involved in a controversy with Real Madrid player, Karembeu. Edilson months earlier claimed that the French was not a player for Real Madrid, to which Lorenzo Sanz replied that "Who is Edilson?". In the match against Real Madrid, a 2–2 draw, Edilson scored both goals of Corinthians, the first after giving a nutmeg to Karembeu. Later in the competition, won by Corinthians, Edilson was named Golden Ball of the tournament. However, his spell at the club ended only a few weeks later, after a semi-final loss to Palmeiras in the Copa Libertadores, fans stormed the training session and started a brawl.

Edilson then moved to Flamengo, helping the team win the Rio de Janeiro State Championship and the 2001 Copa dos Campeões. Yet, he did not perform to expectations in the Brasileirão, and after starting a brawl with Petković, the club shipped him to Cruzeiro in 2002. After a second stint in Japan, in 2002 and 2003, he returned to Flamengo in 2003, performing better in the Brasileirão, scoring 13 times, while also helping the team reach the final of the Copa do Brasil.

In 2004, Edilson changed teams again, signing with Vitória, where he won another State Championship, the Campeonato Baiano. In the Brasileirão, he scored 19 goals, but could not prevent his team from being relegated. Faced with late salaries, Edílson moved to United Arab Emirates, joining Al Ain, where he won local Cup tournament, and helped the club finish second in the 2004–05 UAE Football League. In the final years of his career, he passed through São Caetano, Vasco da Gama, Nagoya Grampus and Bahia, finally retiring in 2010, at 39.

International career
Edilson debuted for Brazil on 24 June 1993, in a 3–0 win against Paraguay. He then spent several years without playing, returning in 2001, when he became an important player in the final stages of the CONMEBOL qualification for the 2002 FIFA World Cup. He was a used substitution in the games against China and England and started in the matches against Costa Rica and Turkey.

After football

Media career
Since November 2019, Edilson appears daily as a pundit on Bandeirantes' Os Donos da Bola.

Career statistics

Club

International

Honours

Club
Palmeiras
Brasileirão Série A: 1993, 
Campeonato Paulista: 1993, 1994
Torneio Rio – São Paulo: 1993

Corinthians
Brasileirão Série A: 1998, 1999
Campeonato Paulista: 1999
FIFA Club World Cup: 2000

Flamengo
Campeonato Carioca: 2001
Copa dos Campeões: 2001

Cruzeiro
Copa Sul-Minas: 2002

Vitória
Campeonato Baiano: 2004

Al Ain
UAE President's Cup: 2004–05

International
Brazil
FIFA World Cup: 2002

Individual
FIFA Club World Cup Golden Ball: 2000
Bola de Ouro: 1998
Bola de Prata: 1998
Campeonato Carioca best striker: 2001

References

External links
 
 
 
 

1971 births
Living people
Sportspeople from Salvador, Bahia
Brazilian footballers
Brazilian expatriate footballers
Association football forwards
Campeonato Brasileiro Série A players
Campeonato Brasileiro Série B players
1993 Copa América players
2002 FIFA World Cup players
FIFA World Cup-winning players
Primeira Liga players
J1 League players
Brazil international footballers
Brazilian expatriate sportspeople in the United Arab Emirates
Expatriate footballers in Portugal
Expatriate footballers in Japan
Guarani FC players
Sociedade Esportiva Palmeiras players
S.L. Benfica footballers
Kashiwa Reysol players
Sport Club Corinthians Paulista players
CR Flamengo footballers
Cruzeiro Esporte Clube players
Esporte Clube Vitória players
UAE Pro League players
Al Ain FC players
Associação Desportiva São Caetano players
CR Vasco da Gama players
Nagoya Grampus players
Esporte Clube Bahia players
Clube Atlético Taboão da Serra players